Pakri Barawan is a town in the Nawada District of the Indian state of Bihar.

Geography
It is divided into two Gram Panchayats: Pakri Barawan Uttar (North) and Pakri Barawan Dakshini (South).

Demographics
, the town has a population of 68,780.

In Pakri Barawan, the female to male sex ratio is 948/1,000, higher than the state average of 918/1,000. The sex ratio for children in Pakri Barawan is 924:1,000, compared to the Bihar state average of 935:1,000.

The literacy rate of the town is on average 58.64%, lower than the state average of 61.80%. The male literacy rate is approximately 66.87%, and the female literacy rate is approximately 49.64%. Scheduled Castes (SC) constitute 11.58% of the total population, while Schedule Tribes (ST) constitute 0.02%.

References

Cities and towns in Nawada district